Tsvi is a Hebrew masculine given name and may refer to:

Tsvi Misinai (born 1946), Israeli researcher, author, historian, computer scientist and entrepreneur
Tsvi C. Nussbaum (born 1935), American physician
Tsvi Piran (born 1949), Israeli theoretical physicist and astrophysicist

Hebrew masculine given names